Manis Friedman (full name: Menachem Manis HaKohen Friedman, ; born 1946) is a Hassid, rabbi, author, social philosopher and public speaker. He is also the dean of the Bais Chana Institute of Jewish Studies. Friedman authored Doesn't Anyone Blush Anymore?, which was published in 1990 and is currently in its fourth printing. He is featured in the documentary films: The Lost Key (2014), The Jewish Journey: America (2015), and "Patterns of Evidences" (2017).

Biography
Born in Prague, Czechoslovakia in 1946, Friedman immigrated with his family to the United States in 1951. He received his rabbinic ordination at the Rabbinical College of Canada in 1969.

Activities
In 1971, inspired by the teachings of the Lubavitcher Rebbe, Friedman as a Shliach ("emissary") cofounded the Bais Chana Women International, an Institute for Jewish Studies in Minnesota for women with little or no formal Jewish education.  He has served as the school's dean since its inception. From 1984 to 1990, he served as the simultaneous translator for a series of televised talks by the Lubavitcher Rebbe. Friedman briefly served as senior translator for Jewish Educational Media, Inc.

Friedman has lectured in cities throughout the US, as well as London, Hong Kong, Cape Town, and Johannesburg in South Africa, Melbourne and Sydney in Australia, and a number of South and Central American cities. In the wake of the natural disasters in 2004 and 2005, Friedman authored a practical guide to help rescue and relief workers properly understand and deal with the needs of Jewish survivors.

Friedman is the most popular rabbi on YouTube, with over 236,000 subscribers as of January 2023.

Family
Manis Friedman is a Kohen. He is the brother of the Jewish singer Avraham Fried and father of contemporary Jewish religious music vocalist Benny Friedman.

Teachings
Though not extensively published in book form, Friedman's teachings have been cited by many authors writing on various secular issues as well as on exclusively Jewish topics.

Friedman has been quoted in:
Shmuley Boteach, The Private Adam (2005) and Dating Secrets of the Ten Commandments (2001)
Barbara Becker Holstein, Enchanted Self: A Positive Therapy (1997)
Angela Payne, Living Every Single Moment: Embrace Your Purpose Now (2004) 
Sylvia Barack Fishman, A Breath of Life: Feminism in the American Jewish Community (1995)

In their autobiographies, Playing with Fire: One Woman's Remarkable Odyssey by Tova Mordechai (1991) and Shanda: The Making and Breaking of a Self-Loathing Jew by Neal Karlen (2004), the authors ascribe Friedman a role in their increasing religiosity.

Views on love, marriage and femininity

Two types of love
According to Friedman, the love between spouses must overcome the differences between the two parties, generating greater intensity in the relationship. By contrast the love between other family members are predicated upon the commonness the two parties share. Friedman further states that husband and wife, male and female, in essence always remain strangers; for  this reason the acquired love in the relationship is never entirely consistent.

Fidelity
On fidelity in marriage, Friedman is quoted stating "If you help yourself to the benefits of being married when you are single, you're likely to help yourself to the benefits of being single when you're married."

Femininity
Sociologist Lynn Davidman interviewed a number of students studying under Friedman in 1983. She quotes Friedman saying that a woman "violates herself" if she were to refrain from having children and that birth control is a "violent violation of a woman's being". Friedman insisted that the teenage angst experienced by girls stems from the fact that they are already biologically and psychologically ready for marriage but their urges are held back; he believes that, in a perfect world, girls getting married as young as fourteen would be optimal, though that's obviously not realistic in today's society. According to Davidman, Friedman's position on femininity differed entirely from the values of his students.

Controversies

On the Israeli-Arab conflict
Friedman has claimed that the moral way to fight a war is to "Destroy their holy sites. Kill men, women and children (and cattle)," and that if Israel followed this wisdom from the Bible, there would be "no civilian casualties, no children in the line of fire, no false sense of righteousness, in fact, no war." After receiving criticism Friedman clarified that "any neighbor of the Jewish people should be treated, as the Torah commands us, with respect and compassion." Friedman later clarified that when he was quoting from the Torah he was not advocating to actually kill anyone, rather if Israel would threaten to do these things, it would scare its enemies and prevent war.

On victims of pedophilia
Friedman was quoted that survivors of child sexual abuse are not as deeply damaged as some claim and should learn to overcome their traumatic experiences. Friedman's comments were received poorly by advocates who saw his statements as trivialising the experiences of the victims. Friedman subsequently issued an apology for the offensive remarks.

On victims of the holocaust
According to the Australian Jewish News, Friedman, in a speech in the 1980s, framed the holocaust as part of a divine plan. Friedman reportedly stated “Who in fact died and who remained alive had nothing to do with the Nazis,” and “not a single Jewish child died because of the Nazis … they died in their relationship with God.” According to the paper, Friedman's statements were not well received by local holocaust survivors.

Published works
 Doesn't Anyone Blush Anymore? Reclaiming Modesty, Intimacy and Sexuality
 The Relief and Rescue Workers Guide to Judaism - a Rescue Workers Handbook
 The Joy of Intimacy: A Soulful Guide to Love, Sexuality & Marriage

See also 
 Simon Jacobson
 Tzvi Freeman

References

External links

 
 A collection of articles and audio classes by Rabbi Manis Friedman
 Ongoing series of lectures in video and audio form
Official YouTube Channel

1946 births
Living people
21st-century American rabbis
Jewish biblical scholars
American Hasidic rabbis
American people of Czech-Jewish descent
Chabad-Lubavitch (Hasidic dynasty)
Czechoslovak emigrants to the United States
20th-century Jewish biblical scholars
21st-century Jewish biblical scholars
Hasidic writers